This is a survey of the postage stamps and postal history of Uzbekistan.

Uzbekistan, officially the Republic of Uzbekistan ( or ), is a doubly landlocked country in Central Asia, formerly part of the Soviet Union. It has been an independent republic since December 1991. Currently, postal service is provided by O′zbekiston Pochtasi.

First stamps 
The first stamps of Uzbekistan were issued on 7 May 1992. Before then, Uzbekistan used stamps of the Soviet Union.

Overprints 
In 1993 and 1995 the Uzbekistan Post resorted to overprinting stamps of the Soviet Union as supplies of the new Uzbeki stamps ran low.

References

Further reading
 Ahmedov, S. et al. Ŭzbekiston Pochtasi: Tarikh va Taraqqiët = Pochta Uzbekistana: Istorii͡a i Razvitie = Post of Uzbekistan: History and Progress. Tashkent: Maʺnabii͡at, 2014 ISBN 9789943042322 317p. 
 Mukhamedov, I︠U︡. Kh. Pochtovai︠a︡ svi︠a︡zʹ v Uzbekistane. Tashkent: Obʺedinennoe izd-vo, 1961 69p.

Communications in Uzbekistan
Uzbekistan